Satoshi Iida (飯田覚士 Iida Satoshi, born August 11, 1969) is a Japanese professional boxer from Nagoya, Aichi, Japan. Iida won the WBA super flyweight championship of the world in 1997 when he defeated Thai champion Yokthai Sithoar via a 12th-round unanimous decision.

See also
List of super-flyweight boxing champions
List of Japanese boxing world champions
Boxing in Japan

References

External links

1969 births
Living people
Japanese male boxers
Sportspeople from Nagoya
Super-flyweight boxers
Boxing commentators
World super-flyweight boxing champions
World Boxing Association champions
20th-century Japanese people